Manuel Lapuente Díaz (born 15 May 1944) is a Mexican former professional footballer and manager.

Playing career
He has played 13 matches for Mexico and scored 5 goals.

Career as manager
He coached Mexico at the 1998 FIFA World Cup, and lead the squad to win the 1999 FIFA Confederations Cup. At the club level, he has coached Club Puebla, Club Necaxa and Club América to Mexican league titles. He formerly coached Club Puebla In 2010, he was reappointed manager of Club América after the departure of Jesús Ramírez.

Managerial statistics

Honours

Manager
Puebla
Mexican Primera División: 1982–83, 1989–90
Copa México: 1989–90 
CONCACAF Champions' Cup: 1991

Necaxa
Mexican Primera División: 1994–95, 1995–96

América
Mexican Primera División: Verano 2002
CONCACAF Champions' Cup: 2006

Mexico
CONCACAF Gold Cup: 1998
FIFA Confederations Cup: 1999

External links
Manuel Lapuente Website

Managerial statistics from 1996-2006
Managerial track record from 1979–2000 with statistics

1944 births
Living people
Mexican people of Spanish descent
Footballers from Mexico City
Mexican footballers
Association football forwards
C.F. Monterrey players
Club Necaxa footballers
Club Puebla players
Atlas F.C. footballers
Liga MX players
Mexico international footballers
Footballers at the 1967 Pan American Games
Pan American Games medalists in football
Pan American Games gold medalists for Mexico
Medalists at the 1967 Pan American Games
Mexican football managers
Club Puebla managers
Tigres UANL managers
Atlante F.C. managers
Cruz Azul managers
Club Necaxa managers
Club América managers
Mexico national football team managers
1997 Copa América managers
1997 FIFA Confederations Cup managers
1998 FIFA World Cup managers
1999 Copa América managers
1999 FIFA Confederations Cup managers
CONCACAF Gold Cup-winning managers
FIFA Confederations Cup-winning managers